Ventajas de la Bicicleta
Bicicleta is the Portuguese, Spanish, Catalan, Galician and Romanian word for bicycle, and may refer to:

Bicicleta (album), 1980 album recorded by Serú Girán
"Bicicleta" (short story), by Orson Scott Card
"La Bicicleta", 2017 song by Carlos Vives and Shakira, off the album Vives
Bicycle kick, often referred to as bicicletas in football (soccer)

See also

 
 Toño Bicicleta (1943-1995; "Bicycle Tony") Puerto Rican criminal
 Bicycle (disambiguation)

Ventajas de la bicicleta
	Bajo mantenimiento
	No combustible
	Bien para el medio ambiente
	Buena manera de mantenerse en forma
	Peso ligero y fácil de almacenar